Parkgate is a village on the Wirral Peninsula in Cheshire, England, on the banks of the River Dee, adjoining  of salt marsh. At the 2011 Census, it had a population of 3,591.

The village is in Neston civil parish, north-west of the town of Neston and almost contiguous with it.

History
Parkgate was an important port from the start of the 18th century, in particular as an embarkation point for Ireland. The River Dee, which was a shipping route to the Roman city of Deva (Chester), had partly silted up by AD 383, creating a need for a port further downstream. Quays were built, first at Burton and later near the small town of Neston, but further silting required yet another re-siting slightly further downstream near the gate of Neston's hunting park. Hence the settlement of Parkgate was born.

Two distinguished guests stayed at local hostelries. One was Lord Nelson's mistress, (Lady) Emma Hamilton, who was born in nearby Ness and bathed at Parkgate, apparently as a cure for a skin complaint. Another was George Frideric Handel. Contrary to often-repeated legend, he did not stay in Parkgate before sailing to Dublin in November 1741 for the first performance of his Messiah (he travelled from Holyhead). However, he returned from Ireland via Parkgate in August 1742.

As the Dee silted up even more, Parkgate became unusable as a port and was superseded by the port of Liverpool, on the nearby River Mersey. Towards the end of the 18th century, Parkgate was popular as a seaside resort with bathers, but this diminished as the sands of the estuary were consumed with grass. Sailing from Parkgate across the estuary to Bagillt was still possible in 1864, as there is a report of an accident in which the landlord of the Pengwern Arms and his brother were drowned when trying to land in rough sea conditions; three others survived. But as silting progressed, with no beach and no direct access to the sea, Parkgate could manage only small subsistence from fishing and shrimps. The silting of the Dee has been accelerated by the deliberate introduction of the invasive colonising grass Sporobolus anglicus in Connah's Quay in 1928, resulting in the growth of extensive marshlands.

Mostyn House School, a striking black-and-white building, was opened in Parkgate in 1855. From 1862 until it closed in 2010, it was run by the Grenfell family, most recently as an independent co-educational day school. Sir Wilfred Grenfell (1865–1940), a medical missionary to Newfoundland and Labrador, was born in Parkgate and was a pupil at the school. The 6th Duke of Westminster's children attended Mostyn House, including his son the 7th Duke.

During the Second World War, two of Parkgate's houses which contained cellars were converted into air raid shelters for public protection from German bombing. Small lights were placed on the marsh to trick German bombers into thinking settlements were there. After the war, Parkgate flourished as a desirable residential area. The surrounds became a conservation area in 1973.

Notable buildings 
A row of three houses – one formerly a butcher's shop – overlooking the anchorage was built in the early 18th century for the Mostyn estate; they are Grade II* listed. The chapel of Mostyn House School, built in 1895 in red brick and terracotta, is also Grade II* listed.

The Anglican Church of St. Thomas was built in 1843 as a Congregational chapel. It reopened for worship in May 2010, having been closed since it was declared unsafe in 1994.

Community
Parkgate has the highest life expectancy for females in the whole of Cheshire West and Chester.

An affluent village, it is popular with tourists and birdwatchers. During seasonal high tides, the water reaches the sea wall and visitors come to the village to witness the unusual sight. Birdwatchers also come at this time to see the birds usually hidden in the grasses of the marshland. A popular location is the Old Baths site, to the north of the village, from which the marshes can be viewed from a parked vehicle. Sightings are recorded daily on a local website which covers the whole Dee Estuary.

The marshlands of Parkgate are managed by the RSPB as part of the Dee Estuary Nature Reserve.

See also

Listed buildings in Neston

References

Villages in Cheshire
Cheshire West and Chester
Neston